Talheim may refer to places in Baden-Württemberg, Germany:

Talheim, Heilbronn, in the district of Heilbronn
Talheim, Tuttlingen, in the district of Tuttlingen
a borough of Horb am Neckar in Freudenstadt (district)
a borough of Mössingen in Tübingen (district)
a borough of Tengen in Konstanz (district)
a borough of Vellberg in Schwäbisch Hall (district)
a borough of Lauterach in Alb-Donau-District

See also
Thalheim (disambiguation)